The lung microbiota, is the pulmonary microbial community consisting of a complex variety of microorganisms found in the lower respiratory tract particularly on the mucous layer and the epithelial surfaces. These microorganisms include bacteria, fungi, viruses and bacteriophages. The bacterial part of the microbiota has been more closely studied. It consists of a core of nine genera: Prevotella, Sphingomonas, Pseudomonas, Acinetobacter, Fusobacterium, Megasphaera, Veillonella, Staphylococcus, and Streptococcus. They are aerobes as well as anaerobes and aerotolerant bacteria. The microbial communities are highly variable in particular individuals and compose of about 140 distinct families. The bronchial tree for instance contains a mean of 2000 bacterial genomes per cm2 surface. The harmful or potentially harmful bacteria are also detected routinely in respiratory specimens. The most significant are Moraxella catarrhalis, Haemophilus influenzae, and Streptococcus pneumoniae. They are known to cause respiratory disorders under particular conditions namely if the human immune system is impaired. The mechanism by which they persist in the lower airways in healthy individuals is unknown.

The fungal genera that are commonly found make up the lung mycobiome, in the microbiota of the lung, and  include Candida, Malassezia, Neosartorya, Saccharomyces, and Aspergillus, among others.

Role of the epithelial barrier
The airway epithelium together with alveolar macrophages and dendritic cells play a major role in the initial recognition of bacterial products getting into the lower airways with the air. Since some of these products are potent proinflammatory stimuli it is extremely important for the immune system to distinguish between pathogens and non-pathogenic commensals. This prevents the development of constant inflammation and forms tolerance against harmless microbiota. 
This process becomes much more intriguing when taking into account that commensals often share their surface molecules with pathogens.  Epithelial cells are equipped with very sensitive recognition tools - toll like receptors (TLRs),  nucleotide-binding oligomerization domain (NOD)-like receptors (NLRs) and retinoic acid-inducible gene (RIG)-I-like receptors (RLRs) which recognize a broad variety of microbial structural components. After recognition of pathogenic bacteria proinflammatory pathways are activated and cellular components of the adaptive and innate immunity are recruited to the infection site.  One key regulator in this process is NF-κB which translocates from the cytoplasm into the nucleus and activates pro-inflammatory genes in epithelial cells and macrophages. The DNA-binding protein complex recognizes a discrete nucleotide sequence (5’-GGG ACT TTC T-3’) in the upstream region of a variety of response genes.  The activation of NF-κB by a number of stimuli: bacterial cell walls or inflammatory cytokines results in its translocation to the nucleus.

In contrast, harmless bacteria do not cause the translocation of NF-κB into the nucleus thus preventing the inflammation although they can express the same microbe-associated molecular patterns (MAMPs). One possible mechanism explaining this effect was suggested by Neish showing that non-pathogenic S. typhimurium PhoPc and S. pullorum are able to prohibit the ubiquitination of NF-κB inhibitor molecule nuclear factor of NF-κB light polypeptide gene enhancer in B-cells inhibitor alpha (IκB-κ). Another explanation of commensal tolerance of the epithelium refers to the post-translational modification of a protein by the covalent attachment of one or more ubiquitin (Ub) monomers. The inhibition of ubiquitination leads to reduction of inflammation, because only polyubiquitinated (IκB-κ is targeted for degradation by the 26 S proteasome, allowing NF-κB translocation to the nucleus and activation the transcription of effector genes (for example IL-8). Probiotic bacteria such as Lactobacilli are able to modulate the activity of the Ub-proteasome system via inducing reactive oxygen species (ROS) production in epithelial cells. In mammalian cells, ROS have been shown to serve as critical second messengers in multiple signal transduction pathways in response to proinflammatory cytokines. Bacterially induced ROS causes oxidative inactivation of the catalytic cysteine residue of Ub 12 resulting in incomplete but transient loss of cullin-1 neddylation and consequent effects on NF-κB and β-catenin signaling. Another commensal species, B. thetaiotaomicron, attenuates pro-inflammatory cytokine expression by promoting nuclear export of NF-κB subunit RelA, through a peroxisome proliferator activated receptor γ (PPAR-γ)-dependent pathway. PPAR-γ target transcriptionally active Rel A and induce early nuclear clearance limiting the duration of NF-κB action.

The balance between pathogens and commensals is extremely important in the maintenance of homeostasis in the respiratory tract.

Physiology
The airways are continually exposed to a multitude of microorganisms, some of which are able to persist and even colonize respiratory tract. This is possible due to the presence of nutrients, oxygen, and optimal growth temperature. There are several host-derived nutrient sources for microbial residents:  secretions from airway epithelial cells (especially goblet cells), secretions from submucosal glands and transudate from plasma. Moreover, the pool of available nutrients is increased by the activities of some members of the microbiota. Macromolecular components of respiratory secretions (proteins, glycoproteins, lipids, nucleic acids) are converted to nutrients (e.g. carbohydrates, amino acids). Thus, the metabolic activity of present bacteria allow for the colonization of new species.  
The commensal bacteria are nonpathogenic and defend our airways against the pathogens. There are several possible mechanisms. Commensals are the native competitors of pathogenic bacteria, because they tend to occupy the same ecological niche inside the human body. Secondly, they are able to produce antibacterial substances called bacteriocins which inhibit the growth of pathogens.

Genera Bacillus, Lactobacillus, Lactococcus, Staphylococcus, Streptococcus, and Streptomyces are the main producers of bacteriocins in respiratory tract. Moreover, commensals are known to induce Th1 response and anti-inflammatory interleukin (IL)-10, antimicrobial peptides, FOXP3, secretory immunoglobulin A (sIgA) production.

Clinical significance

Changes in microbial community composition seem to play a role in progression of such pulmonary disorders as chronic obstructive pulmonary disease (COPD), asthma, and cystic fibrosis. In humans, S. aureus is part of the normal microbiota present in the upper respiratory tract, and on skin and in the gut mucosa. S. aureus, along with similar species that can colonize and act symbiotically but can cause disease if they begin to take over the tissues they have colonized or invade other tissues, have been called "pathobionts". MRSA can similarly colonize people without making them sick. The presence of such genera as Mycoplasma, Pseudomonas, and Staphylococcus is correlated with stable COPD state. On the other hand, Prevotella, Mesorhizobium, Microbacterium, Micrococcus, Veillonela, Rhizobium, Stenotrophomonas, and Lactococcus present mostly in healthy individual cohort. The relative abundance of Proteobacteria is increased in asthmatic children. Pseudomonas aeruginosa, Staphylococcus aureus, and Burkholderia cepacia are found most often in cystic fibrosis patients.

High-throughput sequencing and the whole genome sequencing approaches will provide the further information about the complexity and physiological implication of commensal bacteria in the lower respiratory tract.

See also
 Human microbiome
 List of human flora
 Bacteriocin

References

External links

Microbiomes